I Breathe is a song written by Alexander Bard and Anders Wollbeck. It was recorded by Vacuum, who released it as a single scoring a late 1996-early 1997 hit.
Single peaked #4 in Italy singles chart.

Charts

References

1996 singles
English-language Swedish songs
1997 songs
Stockholm Records singles
Songs written by Alexander Bard
Songs written by Anders Wollbeck